The 1984 United States Senate election in Massachusetts was held on November 6, to elect a member of the U.S. Senate from the State of Massachusetts. The election was won by Democrat John Kerry, the Lieutenant Governor of Massachusetts, who remained Senator until 2013, when he resigned to become United States Secretary of State. One-term incumbent Democratic Senator Paul Tsongas declined to seek re-election after developing cancer.

Democratic primary

Candidates

Declared
  David M. Bartley, Secretary of Administration and Finance and former Massachusetts Speaker of the House 
  Michael Connolly, Secretary of the Commonwealth
  John Kerry, Lieutenant Governor
  James Shannon, U.S. Representative from Lawrence

Withdrew
 Ed Markey, U.S. Representative from Malden

Declined
 Francis Bellotti, former Massachusetts Attorney General
 William Bulger, President of the Massachusetts Senate
 Michael Dukakis, incumbent Governor
 Edward J. King, former Governor
 Paul Tsongas, incumbent Senator

To the surprise of many, incumbent Senator Paul Tsongas retired, despite his very young age and popularity. Tsongas disclosed his diagnosis with lymphoma in January, and cited his desire to spend more time with his family.

By the month's end, four Democratic candidates announced they would run to succeed Tsongas. On the day of Tsongas's retirement, Secretary of the Commonwealth Michael J. Connolly said, "I expect to be a candidate for the U.S. Senate." The first major candidate to declare was Edward Markey, a four-term representative from Malden who had become nationally famous as a leading advocate for a nuclear freeze. He was followed by former Massachusetts House Speaker David Bartley and Lieutenant Governor John Kerry.

In early February, Rep. James Shannon declared his candidacy. Shannon was already Tsongas's successor in Congress as the representative from the Lowell and Merrimack Valley seat. He boasted the support of Speaker of the House Tip O'Neill, and hoped to win the endorsement of Governor Michael Dukakis, whom he had supported in the contentious 1978 primary.

Campaign
In early May, Markey shook up the race by announcing that he would withdraw to stand for re-election to his House seat. Markey would go on to successfully run for the seat in 2013, after Kerry's resignation in order to become U.S. Secretary of State under the Obama Administration. Shannon got another boost when he won the endorsement of the Massachusetts Democratic Convention, with 53 percent of the delegates. With O'Neill's support, Shannon secured the support of feminists and organized labor.

By June, the race shaped up as a two-way contest between Shannon and John Kerry, who was the only candidate with statewide experience and recognition. Despite Shannon's victory at the convention, polls showed that Kerry led by nine points among likely primary voters. Polling also showed that Kerry matched up best with Elliot Richardson, the leading Republican candidate.

Both candidates focused their attacks on Elliot Richardson, with Shannon stressing that Richardson would be an ineffective representative. Kerry, a prominent anti-war activist and veteran, criticized Richardson for his support of President Nixon's strategy in Vietnam and the bombing of Cambodia.

Results
Kerry won a close race against Shannon by 24,529 votes, or 3.11 percent of votes cast.

Shannon attempted to replicate Tsongas's victory over Paul Guzzi in the 1978 primary by performing extremely well in his home district, but he was unable to overcome Kerry's advantage throughout the rest of the commonwealth.

Bartley performed well in his native Hampden County, especially in his hometown of Holyoke.

Republican primary

Candidates
  Elliot Richardson, former cabinet official in the Nixon and Ford administrations
  Ray Shamie, businessman and 1982 Senate nominee

Declined
 John Lakian, candidate for governor in 1982

Campaign
With Tsongas an early favorite for re-election, only one Republican entered the race to challenge him: conservative Ray Shamie, the 1982 nominee for Senate against Ted Kennedy. However, once Tsongas announced in January that he would not stand for re-election, the prospect of a divided Democratic Party encouraged Republicans to consider regaining this seat, which they held from 1937 until 1979.

In January, White House operatives on behalf of President Reagan encouraged liberal Elliot Richardson to run. The former Massachusetts Attorney General, cabinet official, and Watergate icon had been at odds with the administration on foreign policy, but Reagan officials preferred him to Shamie nonetheless, as Shamie was considered incapable of winning the general election. Richardson officially entered the race on March 19, citing "the preservation of peace" and casting himself as a supporter of President Reagan's agenda.

Shamie responded by attacking Richardson for his late entry into the race, his moderate ideology, and his position as a member of Boston's elite establishment. Shamie aimed at the increasingly conservative Republican base, citing his own support for tax cuts and Reagan's  foreign policy agenda, while calling Richardson "a liberal Rockefeller-type Republican who would be very comfortable in the Democratic Party." Despite Shamie's aggressive attacks, Richardson was still seen as the leading candidate for the seat as the summer campaign season began.

Throughout the campaign, Richardson was hampered by his dull speaking style and long service in Washington, which had kept him away from Massachusetts politics. He attempted to counter this image by meeting voters face-to-face and collecting signatures at town dumps. As the leading candidate in both parties, he faced attacks from John Kerry and James Shannon in addition to Shamie.

Debates
WCVB-TV Debate, September 6

Polling

Results
Despite his early lead in polls, Richardson failed to win the Republican nomination. Shamie easily won the September 18 primary with over 60% of the vote. Richardson only managed to carry a few municipalities in the Berkshires, Cape and Islands region, and Boston's wealthy suburbs. Richardson also won the liberal college towns of Amherst and Cambridge.

General election

See also 

  United States Senate elections, 1984
  1984 United States presidential election

Further reading 
  Kranish, Michael, Brian C. Mooney, and Nina J. Easton. John F. Kerry: The Complete Biography by the Boston Globe Reporters Who Know Him Best, PublicAffairs, 2004. .

References 

Massachusetts
John Kerry
1984
1984 Massachusetts elections